was a town located in Saihaku District, Tottori Prefecture, Japan.

As of 2003, the town had an estimated population of 8,147 and a density of 98.06 persons per km². The total area was 83.08 km².

On October 1, 2004, Saihaku, along with the town of Aimi (also from Saihaku District), was merged to create the town of Nanbu.

External links
Official town website (in Japanese)

Dissolved municipalities of Tottori Prefecture